The Ebenezer Maxwell House, operated today as the Ebenezer Maxwell Mansion, is an historic house located in the West Germantown neighborhood of Philadelphia, Pennsylvania.

History and architectural features
The house was built for $10,000 in 1859 by Ebenezer Maxwell (1827–1870), a wealthy cloth merchant. 

The masonry building is two-and-a-half stories, with a three-story tower. The main roof is mansard, with slate covering. The house features three porches and four stone chimneys. The original architecture has been attributed variously to Joseph C. Hoxie (1814–1870) and Samuel Sloan. 

In 1965, the house was restored by the Germantown Historical Society. In 1970, a porch was removed, and in 1979–1980, a cast-iron sidewalk was moved from 1907 N. 7th St. and installed in the rear porch of the house.

The house was added to the National Register of Historic Places in 1971; it is a contributing property of the Tulpehocken Station Historic District.

House museum
The house has been renovated to its Victorian-era appearance. It is operated, along with its gardens, as a house museum.

Gallery

See also

 Wyck House
 John 
Johnson House
Three generation family (Epperson) resided in the house until October 31, 1964

References

External links

 Official museum website
 Listing, drawings, and photographs at the Historic American Buildings Survey
 Listing at Philadelphia Architects and Buildings

Houses on the National Register of Historic Places in Philadelphia
Gothic Revival architecture in Pennsylvania
Houses completed in 1859
Historic house museums in Philadelphia
Historic district contributing properties in Pennsylvania
Germantown, Philadelphia